José Vidal (15 December 1896 – 3 July 1974) was a Uruguayan footballer. He was member of Uruguay squad which won gold medal at 1924 Olympics. He was also part of national team which won South American Championship in 1923 and 1924.

References

External links

 profile
 Uruguay - Record International Players
 

1896 births
1974 deaths
Uruguayan people of Spanish descent
Uruguayan footballers
Footballers at the 1924 Summer Olympics
Olympic footballers of Uruguay
Olympic gold medalists for Uruguay
Uruguay international footballers
Olympic medalists in football
Copa América-winning players
Medalists at the 1924 Summer Olympics
Association football midfielders
Club Nacional de Football players